Chryseobacterium ginsengiterrae  is a Gram-negative, rod-shaped, aerobic and non-motile bacteria from the genus of Chryseobacterium which has been isolated from soil from a ginseng field.

References 

ginsengiterrae
Bacteria described in 2015